Mount Hall is a rock peak,  high, standing  southwest of Mount Daniel, surmounting the snow-covered, tabular mountain block which forms the south end of Lillie Range, in the foothills of the Prince Olav Mountains, Antarctica. It was discovered and photographed by the U.S. Ross Ice Shelf Traverse Party (1957–58) under A.P. Crary, and named by him for Lieutenant Commander Ray E. Hall, U.S. Navy, a pilot of U.S. Navy Squadron VX-6 during Operation Deep Freeze.

References

Mountains of the Ross Dependency
Dufek Coast